Peter Gamper (born 30 November 1940) is a retired German sprinter. He won a European title in the 4 × 100 m relay at the 1962 European Athletics Championships, together with Manfred Germar, Hans-Joachim Bender and Klaus Ulonska. Individually, he finished third in the 100 m, behind Claude Piquemal and Jocelyn Delecour.

References

1940 births
Living people
German male sprinters
European Athletics Championships medalists